The Radiolaria, also called Radiozoa, are protozoa of diameter 0.1–0.2 mm that produce intricate mineral skeletons, typically with a central capsule dividing the cell into the inner and outer portions of endoplasm and ectoplasm. The elaborate mineral skeleton is usually made of silica. They are found as zooplankton throughout the global ocean. As zooplankton, radiolarians are primarily heterotrophic, but many have photosynthetic endosymbionts and are, therefore, considered mixotrophs. The skeletal remains of some types of radiolarians make up a large part of the cover of the ocean floor as siliceous ooze. Due to their rapid change as species and intricate skeletons, radiolarians represent an important diagnostic fossil found from the Cambrian onwards.

Description
Radiolarians have many needle-like pseudopods supported by bundles of microtubules, which aid in the radiolarian's buoyancy. The cell nucleus and most other organelles are in the endoplasm, while the ectoplasm is filled with frothy vacuoles and lipid droplets, keeping them buoyant. The radiolarian can often contain symbiotic algae, especially zooxanthellae, which provide most of the cell's energy. Some of this organization is found among the heliozoa, but those lack central capsules and only produce simple scales and spines.

Some radiolarians are known for their resemblance to regular polyhedra, such as the icosahedron-shaped Circogonia icosahedra pictured below.

Taxonomy
The radiolarians belong to the supergroup Rhizaria together with (amoeboid or flagellate) Cercozoa and (shelled amoeboid) Foraminifera. Traditionally the radiolarians have been divided into four groups—Acantharea, Nassellaria, Spumellaria and Phaeodarea. Phaeodaria is however now considered to be a Cercozoan. Nassellaria and Spumellaria both produce siliceous skeletons and were therefore grouped together in the group Polycystina. Despite some initial suggestions to the contrary, this is also supported by molecular phylogenies. The Acantharea produce skeletons of strontium sulfate and is closely related to a peculiar genus, Sticholonche (Taxopodida), which lacks an internal skeleton and was for long time considered a heliozoan. The Radiolaria can therefore be divided into two major lineages: Polycystina (Spumellaria + Nassellaria) and Spasmaria (Acantharia + Taxopodida).

There are several higher-order groups that have been detected in molecular analyses of environmental data. Particularly, groups related to Acantharia and Spumellaria. These groups are so far completely unknown in terms of morphology and physiology and the radiolarian diversity is therefore likely to be much higher than what is currently known.

The relationship between the Foraminifera and Radiolaria is also debated. Molecular trees support their close relationship—a grouping termed Retaria. But whether they are sister lineages or whether the Foraminifera should be included within the Radiolaria is not known.

Biogeography

In the diagram on the right, a Illustrates generalized radiolarian provinces and their relationship to water mass temperature (warm versus cool color shading) and circulation (gray arrows). Due to high-latitude water mass submergence under warm, stratified waters in lower latitudes, radiolarian species occupy habitats at multiple latitudes, and depths throughout the world oceans. Thus, marine sediments from the tropics reflect a composite of several vertically stacked faunal assemblages, some of which are contiguous with higher latitude surface assemblages. Sediments beneath polar waters include cosmopolitan deep-water radiolarians, as well as high-latitude endemic surface water species. Stars in (a) indicate the latitudes sampled, and the gray bars highlight the radiolarian assemblages included in each sedimentary composite. The horizontal purple bars indicate latitudes known for good radiolarian (silica) preservation, based on surface sediment composition. 

Data show that some species were extirpated from high latitudes but persisted in the tropics during the late Neogene, either by migration or range restriction (b). With predicted global warming, modern Southern Ocean species will not be able to use migration or range contraction to escape environmental stressors, because their preferred cold-water habitats are disappearing from the globe (c). However, tropical endemic species may expand their ranges toward midlatitudes. The color polygons in all three panels represent generalized radiolarian biogeographic provinces, as well as their relative water mass temperatures (cooler colors indicate cooler temperatures, and vice versa).

Radiolarian shells

Radiolarians are unicellular predatory protists encased in elaborate globular shells usually made of silica and pierced with holes. Their name comes from the Latin for "radius". They catch prey by extending parts of their body through the holes. As with the silica frustules of diatoms, radiolarian shells can sink to the ocean floor when radiolarians die and become preserved as part of the ocean sediment. These remains, as microfossils, provide valuable information about past oceanic conditions.

Fossil record

The earliest known radiolaria date to the very start of the Cambrian period, appearing in the same beds as the first small shelly fauna—they may even be terminal Precambrian in age. They have significant differences from later radiolaria, with a different silica lattice structure and few, if any, spikes on the test. About ninety percent of known radiolarian species are extinct. The skeletons, or tests, of ancient radiolarians are used in geological dating, including for oil exploration and determination of ancient climates.

Some common radiolarian fossils include Actinomma, Heliosphaera and Hexadoridium.

See also
 Radiolarite

References

External links

Radiolarians

Radiolaria.org

Radiolaria—Droplet
Tree Of Life—Radiolaria

Amoeboids
Extant Cambrian first appearances
Bikont subphyla
Taxa named by Thomas Cavalier-Smith